Amy Laura Ephron (born October 21, 1952) is an American novelist, screenwriter, journalist, and film producer.

Life and career
Ephron was born in Beverly Hills, California, to Phoebe and Henry Ephron, both East Coast born and raised screenwriters. She is the sister of Nora Ephron, Delia Ephron, and Hallie Ephron. She is Jewish. Carnival Magic, her second novel for children, a companion to her first, published May 1, 2018, by Philomel, Penguin Kids. Her first novel for children, The Castle in the Mist, was published February 2017 by Philomel, Penguin Kids. It was an Amazon best book for kids 'pick of the month' and a Barnes & Noble pick for best book of the year.  It has been nominated for a SCIBA Award. Her novel A Cup of Tea spent 37 weeks on the Los Angeles Times bestseller list and has been bought by Bruckheimer Films. Her latest novel One Sunday Morning received the Booklist Best Fiction of the Year award and Booklist's Best Historical Fiction award in 2005 and was a Barnes and Noble Book Club selection. Her family is Jewish.

Ephron is a Contributing Editor and Contributor to Vogue and Vogue.com. Her stories and essays have appeared in The New York Times, House Beautiful, Saveur, Los Angeles Times,  the Chicago Tribune, National Lampoon, The Huffington Post, etc. She is also the Executive Producer of Warner Bros′ Alfonso Cuaron's A Little Princess. As a film executive she worked on Born on the Fourth of July and Out of Africa, among others. She was also a non-broadcast Editor at the Children's Television Workshop, developing and producing toys and games for Sesame Street and The Electric Company.

She has been married twice, first to film producer Sasha Harari, with whom she has three children, Anna, Maia and Ethan, and currently to lawyer Alan Rader.

Bibliography
Carnival Magic' (May 2018) The Castle in the Mist (Feb 2017)Loose Diamonds . . . and Other Things I've Lost (and Found) along the Way (2011)One Sunday Morning (2006)A Cup of Tea: A Novel of 1917 (2005)White Rose: Una Rosa Blanca (2000)Biodegradable Soap (1991)Bruised Fruit (1988)Cool Shades (1984)

FilmographyA Little Princess'' (1995) - Producer

References

External links

Amy Ephron on The Huffington Post
Powell's Books Review of One Sunday Morning
Amy Ephron's One for the Table
Amy Ephron's website

1952 births
20th-century American novelists
American women journalists
Living people
Jewish American novelists
American women novelists
20th-century American women writers
Ephron family
20th-century American non-fiction writers
21st-century American Jews
21st-century American women